Generative pre-trained transformers (GPT) are a family of language models by OpenAI generally trained on a large corpus of text data to generate human-like text. They are built using several blocks of the transformer architecture. They can be fine-tuned for various natural language processing tasks such as text generation, language translation, and text classification. The "pre-training" in its name refers to the initial training process on a large text corpus where the model learns to predict the next word in a passage, which provides a solid foundation for the model to perform well on downstream tasks with limited amounts of task-specific data.

List of products

On June 11, 2018, OpenAI released a paper entitled "Improving Language Understanding by Generative Pre-Training", in which they introduced the Generative Pre-trained Transformer (GPT).
At this point, the best-performing neural NLP models primarily employed supervised learning from large amounts of manually labeled data. This reliance on supervised learning limited their use on datasets that were not well-annotated, in addition to making it prohibitively expensive and time-consuming to train extremely large models; many languages (such as Swahili or Haitian Creole) are difficult to translate and interpret using such models due to a lack of available text for corpus-building. In contrast, GPT's "semi-supervised" approach involved two stages: an unsupervised generative "pre-training" stage in which a language modeling objective was used to set initial parameters, and a supervised discriminative "fine-tuning" stage in which these parameters were adapted to a target task.

References

OpenAI
Large language models
Open-source artificial intelligence
Software using the MIT license